Theodor Burghele (12 February 1905 – 3 June 1977) was a Romanian surgeon and urologist, titular member  and President of the Romanian Academy, and Minister of Health.

He was born in Iași in an old Moldavian boyar family, the son of Theodor Burghele and Fenareta, née Stoianovici. He studied at the Faculty of Medicine of the University of Iași (1922–1928), obtaining in 1929 an MD degree with thesis Mycotic splenomegaly. He then took specialization courses at the Urology Clinic of the University of Vienna (1930–1931). In 1937 Burghele became lecturer in the Department of Surgery at Colțea Hospital and in 1940 he was promoted to associate professor. In 1941 he was conscripted, and in 1942 he served as doctor in Tiraspol. In 1946, when a urinary tract surgery clinic was set up at Panduri Hospital, he was appointed professor at the Faculty of Medicine of the University of Bucharest, and took over the management of the clinic.

In 1948, he joined the Romanian Communist Party (PCR). From 1957 to 1972 he was rector of the Carol Davila University of Medicine and Pharmacy. In 1955 Burghele was elected corresponding member of the Romanian Academy; he became titular member in 1963 and served as President of the Academy from 1976 to 1977. Between 1972 and 1975 he held the position of Minister of Health. From 1972 to 1977 he was an alternate member of the Central Committee of the PCR.

Burghele died in Bucharest on 3 June 1977, and is buried at Bellu Cemetery.

The Panduri Hospital in Bucharest which he led as director for many years was renamed in 1991, and is now called the "Prof. Dr. Theodor Burghele" Clinical Hospital.

Publications

References

External links

1905 births
1977 deaths
Physicians from Iași
Alexandru Ioan Cuza University alumni
University of Vienna alumni
Romanian urologists
Romanian medical writers
Academic staff of the University of Bucharest
Academic staff of the Carol Davila University of Medicine and Pharmacy
Presidents of the Romanian Academy
Romanian Ministers of Health
Romanian Communist Party politicians
Burials at Bellu Cemetery